Souk El Fekka is one of the souks of the medina of Tunis.

Location 
It is directly located in front of the Ez-Zituna Mosque, near Souk El Attarine.

Products 
It is possible to buy ingredients for the preparation of cakes present at every celebrations, such as birth, circumcision, marriage or Eid al-Fitr, which marks the end of the month of Ramadan. Almonds, as well as walnuts, pistachios and raisins are available in baskets, whereas bottles of almond or pistachio syrups, called rouzata from the Spanish word orchata, are aligned on the shelves.

Notes and references

External links 
  Virtual visit of Souk El Fekka

Fekka